Xiphocaridinella is a genus of shrimps belonging to the family Atyidae.

The species of this genus are found in Western Asia.

Species:

Xiphocaridinella ablaskiri 
Xiphocaridinella dbari 
Xiphocaridinella fagei 
Xiphocaridinella falcirostris 
Xiphocaridinella jusbaschjani 
Xiphocaridinella kumistavi 
Xiphocaridinella kutaissiana 
Xiphocaridinella motena 
Xiphocaridinella osterloffi 
Xiphocaridinella otapi 
Xiphocaridinella shurubumu 
Xiphocaridinella smirnovi

References

Atyidae
Decapod genera